Louis-André Beaussier de Chateauvert (Toulon, 8 January 1725 — Paris, 21 May 1789) was a French Navy officer. He notably served during the War of American Independence.

Biography 
Chateauvert was born to Thérèse-Marie Giraudy de Piosin-Montauban  and Chef d'Escadre André Beaussier de Châteauvert. His brother, Pierre André Beaussier de Montauban, uncle Louis-Joseph de Beaussier de l'Isle, and his grandfather were also Navy officers.

He joined the Navy as a Garde-Marine on 1 January 1741. He was promoted to Lieutenant on 11 February 1756, and to Commander on a October 1764.

Chateauvert was promoted to Captain on 15 November 1771.

In 1778, Chateauvert captained the 74-gun Intrépide, part of the Blue squadron under Orléans and Lamotte-Picquet. He took part in the Battle of Ushant on 27 July 1778.

In 1779, Chateauvert commanded Intrépide in the Blue-with-white-cross squadron of the Armada of 1779.

In 1780 and 1781, Chateauvert was given command, in turn of the brand-new 106-gun Royal Louis, the 74-gun Robuste, and the 110-gun Terrible.

Chateauvert was promoted to Chef d'Escadre on 12 January 1782.

Sources and references 
 Notes

Citations

References
 
 
 

External links
 

French Navy officers
French military personnel of the American Revolutionary War